Trevor Aaronson is an American journalist. He is a contributing writer at The Intercept and author of The Terror Factory: Inside the FBI's Manufactured War on Terrorism. He was a 2020 ASU Future Security Fellow at New America and a 2015 TED Fellow. 

Aaronson is the creator and host of the documentary podcasts American ISIS, which tells the story of Russell Dennison, an American who joined the Islamic State as a fighter in Syria; and Chameleon: High Rollers, which investigates an FBI undercover operation in Las Vegas. 

In January 2023, Aaronson launched a podcast series called Alphabet Boys about "secret investigations of the FBI, CIA, DEA, ATF, and other alphabet agencies". The first season, Trojan Hearse, focuses on the summer 2020 COINTELPRO-like infiltration of antifa / Black Lives Matter protesters and activists in Denver, Colorado following the murder of George Floyd in Minnesota in May 2020.

Aaronson has won the Molly National Journalism Prize, the Data Journalism Award and the John Jay College/Harry Frank Guggenheim Excellence in Criminal Justice Reporting Award.

Works
 The Terror Factory: Inside the FBI's Manufactured War on Terrorism, Ig Publishing, 2013,

References

External links
 
  "How this FBI strategy is actually creating US-based terrorists" (TED2015)

American male journalists
Living people
Year of birth missing (living people)
Writers from Florida
TED Fellows